Lisu may refer to:

Lisu people, an ethnic group of Southeast Asia
Lisu language, spoken by the Lisu people
Old Lisu Alphabet or Fraser Alphabet
Lisu syllabary
Lisu (Unicode block), the block of Unicode characters for the Lisu language.
Lisu Church, Christian church of the Lisu people

See also
Li Su (disambiguation)